Michel Jean-Paul Zanoli  (10 January 1968 – 29 December 2003) was a former road cyclist from the Netherlands. He competed in the men's road race and men's team time trial at the 1988 Summer Olympics, finishing 15th and 11th respectively. Zanoli died of heart failure.

See also
 List of Dutch Olympic cyclists
 List of people from Amsterdam

References

1968 births
2003 deaths
Dutch male cyclists
Olympic cyclists of the Netherlands
Cyclists at the 1988 Summer Olympics
Cyclists from Amsterdam